Yemen competed at the 2017 Asian Indoor and Martial Arts Games held in Ashgabat, Turkmenistan from September 17 to 27. Yemen sent a delegation consisting of 7 participants for the event competing in 4 different sports.

Yemeni team couldn't receive any medal in the multi-sport event.

Participants

References 

Nations at the 2017 Asian Indoor and Martial Arts Games
Asia